Joey Scouts is the section of Scouts Australia for boys and girls aged 5 to 7 (inclusive), often known simply as 'Joeys'. The Joey Scout section is the first age section in the Australian Scout Movement and comes before Cub Scouts. Joey Scouts wear a uniform shirt with navy blue panels, and tawny shoulders.

Their motto is now "Discover Adventure".

Patrol organisation
The Joey Scout Unit is usually composed of several adult leaders, and several patrols of approximately six children. The leader of a patrol is called a Patrol Leader, an older Joey Scout in the unit. Second in command of a patrol is an Assistant Patrol Leader. However, they are usually patrol leaders in title only, as Joey Scouts take on very little of the leadership compared to later sections. Each patrol wears a distinctive colour band on their scarf, choosing from red, yellow, green, orange, blue, black, white, grey, tan, and purple.

Unit councils 

The Unit Council is an informal meeting of Adult Leaders and the Patrol Leaders, and often Assistant Patrol Leaders (although any member of the patrol can be invited), to discuss things such as what activities or camps were liked or disliked during the term, and what the patrols would like to try in the future. At this age, the adult leaders do most of the planning and running of activities, but they still get Joey Scouts involved to introduce them to these concepts.

Ideals
Joey Scouts share their Promise and Law with the other four sections in the movement.

Scout Promise

There are two version of the Promise. The new one (first), and the original (second). Each member may choose which one they would like to make when joining.

On my honour, I promise
To do my best,
To be true to my spiritual beliefs,
To contribute to my community and our world,
To help other people,
And to live by the Scout Law.

or

On my honour
I promise that I will do my best
To do my duty to my God, and
To the King of Australia,
To help other people,
And to live by the Scout Law.

Scout Law

Although Joey Scouts still use the same Scout Law, due to their age, they usually just focus on the three headings.

Be Respectful:
Be friendly and considerate
Care for others and the environment

Do What is Right:
Be trustworthy, honest and fair
Use resources wisely

Believe in Myself:
Learn from my experiences
Face challenges with courage

Badgework

Milestones
There are three levels of Milestones - Milestone 1, Milestone 2, & Milestone 3. Each Milestone is obtained by completing a set number of participates, assists, and leads of activities, as well as a personal reflection. As a general guideline, Joey Scouts complete Milestone 1 by five years of age, Milestone 2 by six years of age, and Milestone 3 by seven years of age. Milestone badges are worn on the right front panel of the uniform.

Special Interest Areas (SIA) 
There are six Special Interest Areas - Adventure & Sport, Arts & Literature, Creating a Better World, Environment, Growth & Development, and STEM & Innovation. Joeys must complete six SIA projects across at least two different Areas. Each project must take a minimum of two hours to complete. Projects are fully planned, executed, and reviewed by the Joeys, albeit with more supervision from Adult Leaders than other sections . Projects may be completed as individuals, or in project patrols. SIA badges are worn in the middle of the left sleeve of the uniform.

Outdoor Adventure Skills (OAS) 
There are two types of Outdoor Adventure Skills. Core and Specialist. Core OAS include Bushcraft, Bushwalking, and Camping while Specialist OAS are split into terrafirma: Alpine, Cycling, and Vertical - and water-based: Aquatics, Boating, and Paddling. Each discipline has 9 Stages to be completed throughout a youth member's entire Scouting Journey (from Joey Scouts to Rover Scouts). Some disciplines split into even more specialist streams once they reach a certain Stage. Joey Scouts must reach Stage 1 in all Core Disciplines, and may complete some Specialist Stages, although not required. OAS badges are worn at the bottom of the left sleeve of the uniform.

Peak Award
Sometimes referred to as the Joey Scout Challenge Award, the Peak Award is the highest level badge a Joey Scout can earn, and is akin to the Grey Wolf Award for Cubs, the Australian Scout Award for Scouts, the Queen Scout Award for Venturers, and the Baden Powell Scout Award for Rovers.

To earn the Peak Award, a Joey must earn the Introduction to Scouting, the Introduction to Section, Milestone 3, complete the six SIA projects, meet the OAS requirements of obtaining Stage 1 in the Core Disciplines, as well as lead a three hour Adventurous Journey (hike), and do a personal reflection of their journey in the Joey Section.

The badge consists of a white outline of a kangaroo's head on a plain navy blue diamond-shaped badge with tawny edging, and is placed at the top of the left sleeve of the uniform. Once earned, a Scout may wear the badge for the rest of their Scouting Journey, even into other sections.

References

Scouting and Guiding in Australia